Nathaniel Bowen (June 29, 1779 – August 25, 1839) was the third bishop of South Carolina in the Episcopal Church in the United States of America.

Biography
Nathaniel Bowen was born in Boston, son of the Rev. Penuel Bowen. The family moved to South Carolina when Nathaniel was young and his father died soon after. Nathaniel was raised by the Rev. Robert Smith, who became first bishop of South Carolina. Bowen was married in 1805 to Margaret Blake and they had 10 children, only four of whom survived him.

Bowen graduated from the College of Charleston in 1794; was ordained deacon on June 3, 1800, and priest in October 1802. He served as rector of St. John's Church, Providence, Rhode Island, St. Michael's Church, Charleston, South Carolina and Grace Church, New York City. In 1814 he received a doctor of divinity from the University of Pennsylvania. He was consecrated bishop of South Carolina on October 8, 1818, serving until his death in Charleston on August 25, 1839.

Consecrators

 The Most Reverend William White, 4th presiding bishop of the Episcopal Church
 The Right Reverend John Henry Hobart, 3rd bishop of New York
 The Right Reverend James Kemp, 2nd bishop of Maryland
Nathaniel Bowen was the 17th bishop consecrated for the Episcopal Church.

See also
 List of Bishop Succession in the Episcopal Church
 St. Stephen's Episcopal Church (Charleston, South Carolina), where Nathaniel Bowen presided over the ceremony for the laying of the cornerstone.

References
 The Episcopal Church Annual. Morehouse Publishing: New York, NY (2005).
 Annals of the American Pulpit, William Buell Sprague (Robert Carter & Bros., Cambridge, Mass., 1859), pp. 471–77

External links
 Web site of the Episcopal Church
 Web site of the Diocese of South Carolina

1779 births
1839 deaths
Clergy from Boston
Clergy from Charleston, South Carolina
Episcopal bishops of South Carolina
19th-century Anglican bishops in the United States
American slave owners